Silindile Ngubane (born 25 March 1987) is a South African football striker. She plays for the Durban Ladies and the South Africa women's national football team.

Playing career

International
In October 2012, Ngubane was named to the senior team roster in preparation for the 2012 African Women's Championship in Equatorial Guinea.

In September 2014, Ngubane was named to the senior team roster in preparation for the 2014 African Women's Championship in Namibia.

References

External links
 South Africa player profile

1987 births
Living people
People from uMngeni Local Municipality
Zulu people
Women's association football forwards
South African women's soccer players
South Africa women's international soccer players